Gonzalo Eltesch (born 1981) is a Chilean writer. He was born in Valparaiso and studied literature at university. He also obtained a diploma in publishing from Diego Portales University. Since 2008, he has worked at Penguin Random House Chile. His debut novel Colección particular received wide acclaim. In 2017, he was named as one of the Bogota39, a list of the most promising young writers in Latin America.

Eltesch lives in Barcelona.

References

1981 births
Living people
Chilean male novelists
21st-century Chilean male writers
21st-century Chilean novelists
People from Valparaíso
Diego Portales University alumni